PT Garuda Mataram Motor (GMM) is an Indonesian distributor located in Jakarta. It was founded in 1998 as a joint venture between the Volkswagen Group and the Indomobil Group. PT National Assembler acts as a knock down car assembly plant for GMM.

The units which have been assembled in Indonesia can be identified by a J on the eleventh position of the Vehicle Identification Number.

External links
Audi Indonesia website
Volkswagen Indonesia website

Car manufacturers of Indonesia
Volkswagen Group factories
Manufacturing companies based in Jakarta
Vehicle manufacturing companies established in 1998
1998 establishments in Indonesia

de:IndoMobil Group#Garuda Mataram Motor, PT.